Brooklyn Friends School is a school at 375 Pearl Street in Downtown Brooklyn, New York City.  Brooklyn Friends School (BFS) is an independent, college preparatory Quaker school serving a culturally diverse educational community of approximately 900 students as of 2017–18, from preschool (two years of age) through 12th grade.

History and governance
Founded in 1867 by the Religious Society of Friends as a coeducational Quaker school, Brooklyn Friends School is one of the oldest continuously operating independent schools in New York City.

Starting as a grade school, BFS added a kindergarten in 1902, a high school division in 1907, and a Preschool and Family Center in 1985 and 1992 respectively. The most recent addition, the BFS Preschool, has gained prominence as one of the city's premier early learning centers.

The Academy Award-winning 1981 documentary Close Harmony chronicled how a children's choir of 4th- and 5th-graders from the school joined with elderly retirees from a Brooklyn Jewish seniors' center to give a joint concert.

By 2000, the school's headmaster, who had been in the position for ten years, resigned at the request of the board of trustees over allegations of financial mismanagement; audits revealed a deficit of $900,000 for 2000 and $375,000 for 1999. The outgoing headmaster denied any impropriety, and some parents defended his leadership.

The school had about 400 students in 1995 and about 107 teachers in 2000.

The school was once owned by the Quakers' New York Quarterly Meeting, but the school and the Quaker meeting ended their affiliation in 2010. Few of the school's modern-day students are Quaker, although the school culture and curriculum incorporate Quaker ideals. The school's charter specifies that half of the board of trustees must be Quaker and one of the two chairs of the board must be appointed by the Quakers.

Academics
Brooklyn Friends School is split into four academic levels: Preschool, Lower School (K-4), Middle School (5-8), and Upper School (9-12).

Lower School (K-4)
The Lower School curriculum includes classes in language arts, mathematics, social studies, science, Spanish, dance, music, visual arts, woodworking, physical education, and health.

Middle School (5-8)
The middle school curriculum includes classes in the humanities (English and history), mathematics, science, languages, visual arts, performing arts, physical education, health/life skills, organization and study skills and information technology.

Upper School (9-12)
The Brooklyn Friends Upper School curriculum includes the arts, humanities, sciences, and ethics.

Brooklyn Friends School offers the International Baccalaureate Diploma Programme for students in the 11th and 12th grades.

Faculty and staff union and decertification efforts
In spring 2019, more than 80% of faculty and staff members at the school voted to unionize. The school did not object at the time. In late 2019, collective bargaining over contracts began, and union representatives participated in negotiations over the layoffs of about 30 teachers due to the COVID-19 pandemic in New York City.

In August 2020, however, the school's leadership move to dissolve the faculty and staff members' union, citing a National Labor Relations Board decision several months earlier that reversed an Obama administration-era NLRB decision that allowed employees of  religiously affiliated institutions the right to form unions. The school's move to decertify the union prompted opposition from many parents, who believed the school was betraying its progressive and Quaker values by engaging in "hypocritical union-busting"; over 1,000 parents and alumni signed a petition calling on the school to halt its efforts to decertify the union, and about 130 teachers and staff members signed a similar petition of their own.

Notable alumni 
John Knowles Fitch, founder of Fitch Ratings
Dan Hedaya, actor
Therese (Tay) Hohoff, literary editor
Robert Levin, pianist, musicologist, pedagogue
Patrick "Wiki" Morales, hop-hop artist and producer 
Kyle Neptune, Head Coach of Villanova Wildcats men's basketball
Stacey Plaskett, US House of Representatives Delegate for the US Virgin Islands
Francine Prose, writer and critic
Jasmin St. Claire, actress
Fisher Stevens, actor, director, producer and writer
 Susanne Suba (1913-2012), Hungarian-born watercolorist and illustrator
Adam Yauch (1964-2012), hip-hop artist and member of The Beastie Boys

See also
Education in New York City

References
Notes

External links

 School website

Quaker schools in New York (state)
Educational institutions established in 1867
Private high schools in Brooklyn
Private middle schools in Brooklyn
Private elementary schools in Brooklyn
Downtown Brooklyn
1867 establishments in New York (state)